John L. Markley is an American biochemist.

Markley focuses on NMR spectroscopy and its biological applications, structure function relationships in proteins, stable-isotope-assisted multinuclear magnetic resonance spectroscopy, processing and analysis of multi-dimensional NMR data; structural genomics and metabolomics.

Marley is currently the Steenbock Professor of Biomolecular Structure at the University of Wisconsin–Madison and an Elected Fellow of the American Association for the Advancement of Science.

Research publications

References

Fellows of the American Association for the Advancement of Science
American biochemists
University of Wisconsin–Madison faculty
Living people
Year of birth missing (living people)